Kut Bak is a district (amphoe) of Sakon Nakhon province, Thailand.

Geography
Neighboring districts are (from the north clockwise) Nikhom Nam Un, Phanna Nikhom, Mueang Sakon Nakhon, and Phu Phan of Sakon Nakhon Province, Kham Muang of Kalasin province and Wang Sam Mo of Udon Thani province.

History
The minor district (king amphoe) was created on 1 February 1964, when three tambons,  Kut Bak, Khok Phu, and Na Mong were split from Mueang Sakon Nakhon district. It was upgraded to a full district on 14 November 1967.

Administration 
The district is divided into three sub-districts (tambons), which are further subdivided into 38 villages (mubans). Kut Bak is a township (thesaban tambon) which covers parts of tambon Kut Bak. There are a further three tambon administrative organizations (TAO).

Missing numbers are tambons which now form Phu Phan District.

References

External links
amphoe.com

Kut Bak